The Museum of Osteology, located in Oklahoma City, Oklahoma, U.S., is a private museum devoted to the study of bones and skeletons (osteology). This museum displays over 450 skeletons of animal species from all over the world. With another 7,000 specimens as part of the collection, but not on display, this is the largest privately held collection of osteological specimens in the world. This museum is an entity of their parent company, Skulls Unlimited International.

Overview
The museum focuses on the form and function of the skeletal system with numerous educational and taxonomic displays featuring all five vertebrate classes.

The collections housed by the Museum of Osteology are the result of over 40 years of collecting by Jay Villemarette.

Currently, the collections consist of approximately 7,000 specimens representing over 1,800 species of mammals, birds, reptiles, amphibians and fish.

The museum hosts a multitude of fun educational opportunities and events for all ages. According to the website, one of the main goals of these programs is to make people excited about the natural world and inspire conservation efforts.

There are also many opportunities for museum guests to touch real bone and take pictures with fully articulated skeletons.

Since its opening, over 500,000 guests from all over the world have come to the museum to see the displays, fill out scavenger hunts, explore the collection for research papers, and pick up commemorative items from the gift shop.

Ethics 
The museum does not support or condone poaching or any other illegal hunting practice. All the specimens are ethically sourced. The Museum of Osteology partners with zoos, aquariums, wildlife centers, nature preserves, sportsmen, and private donators to make sure the animals are treated with respect and are properly taken care of after death. The museum also receives donations from human donor programs.

History

Jay Villemarette, founder of the company Skulls Unlimited International, Inc., established the museum alongside his family. Skulls Unlimited's offices and processing facilities are located next to the museum. Construction of the museum began in 2004 and it opened to the public on October 1, 2010.

Jay wanted to share his love of science by displaying his collection and making osteology more accessible to the public. The museum encourages understanding of the complexities of the skeletal structure and an appreciation for extant species.

In 2015, the Museum of Osteology opened a second location, Skeletons: Museum of Osteology in Orlando, Florida at the I-Drive 360 entertainment complex. This location is cited as the largest skeleton museum in America with over 500 skeletons on display. In 2020, the Florida location closed and the collections were combined, making one SKELETONS: Museum of Osteology.

The museum began renovating its exhibits in 2020, making the most of the COVID pandemic closures. The renovations included bright new wallpaper and new skeletons on displays.

The museum has been featured on various media outlets, including TV channels, newspapers, and podcasts. It also has social media profiles on every major platform.

Exhibits 

The museum offers many exhibits from all five vertebrate classes. There are also floating exhibits throughout the museum and whales hanging from the ceiling. All the specimens on display are cleaned at the Skulls Unlimited building next door, using dermestid beetles. The skeletons are articulated and then put on display. The exhibits display a wide range of topics, including locomotion, adaptation, and forensic osteology and pathology. The museum offers scavenger hunts for all ages. The answers to these can be found throughout the exhibits. The 'Explorers Corner" is the section of the museum devoted to hands-on activities for children. There is a mystery skull game where children can touch real animal skulls. They can also dissect owl pellets on the first floor or in the classroom.

Notable specimens 

Humpback Whale - One of 12 fully articulated skeletons in North America. It washed ashore in 2003, was buried for two years and then cleaned by Skulls Unlimited Int. Inc.

The whale was featured on an episode of Mike Rowe's Dirty Jobs, entitled "Skull Cleaner", where Rowe helped clean the skeleton.

Komodo Dragon – One of the first Komodo Dragons to be allowed entry into the United States was a gift from the president of Indonesia to George H. W. Bush.

Chimp from Space Program - Donated to the museum by William Taylor, retired NASA scientist and photographer. Chimp was said to have been used in the space program at Holloman AF, Alamogordo, New Mexico.

Javan Rhino - The rarest specimen in the collection. Out of the five rhino species, the Javan rhino is the most endangered species of rhino.

Sumatran Rhino - Another endangered species of rhino, with only about 80 left in the world. They are the smallest of all the rhino species. The Cincinnati Zoo was the first facility to successfully breed this rhino in over 100 years. One of those rhinos was a female named Suci (Sue-Chee), the museum considered it an honor to be entrusted with her after she died. Dr. Terri Roth, an expert on Sumatran rhinos, who worked extensively to save Suci (from hemochromatosis), has used the museum collection to aid her research.

Cetacean Collection - The museum houses the largest private collection of Cetaceans. This includes whales, dolphins and porpoises. The collection at the museum holds 46 different species, while in the world there is 80 different species.

Hippopotamus- The museum currently features one fully articulated adult Hippopotamus containing a total of 219 bones. On June 28, 2022, Mary Holman, Education Coordinator at the Museum of Osteology and Ashley MB Meerschaert, M.S, Director of Operations of the Museum of Osteology, counted the number of bones in a Hippopotamus skeleton. Until recently, it was unknown to the public just how many bones a Hippopotamus has. This encouraged the education team to find out the average number of bones a Hippopotamus has since no scholarly article or quick Google search had the answer.

Gallery

References

External links 

Museums in Oklahoma City
Natural history museums in Oklahoma
Osteology
2010 establishments in Oklahoma
Museums established in 2010